Zahrat El-Ola (10 June 1934 – 18 December 2013) was an Egyptian actress, and was the second wife of Salah Zulfikar. She was famous for her roles in light comedies and drama in the 1950s and 1960s. She is one of the iconic actresses in Egypt. El-Ola was prolific in golden age of Egyptian cinema. Her first appearance in film was in Mahmoud Zulfikar's My Father Deceived Me (1951), and her last film was Ard Ard (1998).

Career 
After obtaining a diploma from the Institute of Dramatic Arts, she moved with her family to Mahalla al-Kubra and then to Cairo where she was apprenticed by Youssef Wahbi and worked in his theater, then went to work in the cinema.

Zahrat El-Ola participated in more than ten films alongside Salah Zulfikar. She presented works that reached 120 films and 50 television series throughout her career, including the series "Eny Rahela" with Mahmoud Morsy, Laila Hamada and Mohamed El-Araby, and a series on the sidelines of the biography with Ahmed Mazhar both of which were shown in the mid-seventies, and the series "Bela Khatiaa" and "Zohoor W Ashwak" alongside Salah Zulfikar and both of which were shown in the eighties.

Illness and death 
On Mother's Day 21 March 2010, Zahrat El-Ola was unable to attend the ceremony honoring her as an artist and mother in an event held by the Catholic Center under the title Day of Giving, due to her illness, which forced her to stay at home, and no one was able to represent her to receive the award.  She was honored at home by giving her a shield in appreciation of her dedication over the years of her work.  The shield was handed over to her by Father Boutros Daniel, in a kind human gesture. Zahrat El-Ola suffered in her last days of paralysis until she died on the evening of Wednesday, 18 December 2013.

Filmography

Film 
 1951: My Father Deceived Me
 1951: Ana Bent Nas
 1952: Colonialism falls
 1952: Wedding Portrait
 1952: Honorable Mr
 1952: I Believe in God
 1952: Faith
 1953: Window to Heaven
 1953: The Mistake of a Life 
 1953: Aisha
 1953: The Path of Happiness 
 1953: My life partner
 1953: Inferno of Jealousy
 1953: After Farewell
 1953: The Last Meeting
 1954: One Night of My Life 
 1954: The Neighbor's Girl
 1954: Bahbouh Effendi
 1954: The Triumph of Love
 1954: I Am Love
 1954: The Unjust Angel
 1954: The Money and the Boys 
 1954: The happiest days
 1954: Have mercy on my tears 
 1954: Traces in the Sand
 1955: The Kingdom of Women 
 1955: Captain Egypt
 1955: Soul lover
 1955: Our Good Days
 1955: Amani Al Omar
 1955: Dreams of Spring
 1956: Call of Love
 1956: Date Gram
 1956: Confused Hearts 1956
 1956: My wife was murdered
 1956: The call of the oppressed 
 1956: The Stranger
 1956: Ismail Yassin in the Police
1957: Back Again
1957: The Way of Hope
 1957: The Prisoner of Abu Zaabal 
1957: Reply My Heart
 1957: Port Said
 1957: The Empty Cushion
 1957: Crime and Punishment
 1957: Ismail Yassin in the Fleet 
1958: Nos Al-Layl Drivers
 1958: Until We Meet
 1958: Jamila, the Algerian
 1958: Toha
 1958: Abu Oyoun Jare’a
 1959: The Secret of the Invisibility Cap
 1959: Doaa Al-Karawan
 1959: A Woman's Life
 1959: I think of what I forgot
 1959: The Unknown Woman
 1959: God is Greater
 1959: The Last Love
 1959: Ismail Yassin in Air Forces 
 1960: The River of Love
 1960: Heartless Man
 1960: Three Heiresses
 1960: The Hobo Husband
 1960: Holy Rabat
 1961: There is a Man in our House
 1961: Tomorrow Another Day
 1961: Ashour Qalb al-Assad
 1961: The Path of Heroes
 1961: Husband by lease
 1961: Me and My Daughters
 1961: Warm Nights
 1961: The Targuman
 1962: The Oil King
 1962: Wife-Killing Association
 1962: I'm the Fugitive
 1963: The Madmen in Bliss
 1964: For Hanafi
 1964: Bint Al-Hetta
 1965: The Two Brothers
 1966: The Lovers Weep
 1966: Grams in August
 1966: The Single Husband
 1967: The second meeting
 1968: The Six Watching Ones
 1968: The Bravest Man in the World
 1968: Ibn Al-Hetta
 1969: Pickpocket Against His Nose
 1970: The Three Madmen
 1973: Sukkari
 1973: The love that was
 1975: Bloody Sunday
 1975: Victims
 1975: Al- Rida’ Al-Abyad
 1977: For Life
 1977: Prayer of the Oppressed
 1978: Life is lost, my son
 1978: The Lovers Railway
 1978: Calculating the Years
 1978: The Famous Case
 1978: The best Days of my Life
 1979: Sin of An Angel
 1980: Fatwa al-Jabal
 1980: The Stranger Brothers
 1981: Lovers' Clash
 1981: I'm Not Lying But I'm Beautifying
 1982: I lost my love there
 1982: Bus Driver
 1982: A man in a women's prison
 1983: I am not a thief
 1984: Hadi Bady
 1985: Street Angels
 1985: Demon from honey
 1986: Good People, Poor People
 1986: Omar's Journey
 1986: For whom the moon smiles
 1986: I will leave you, Lord
 1986: The Edge of the Sword
 1987: Al-Ardah Al-Halji in a fraud case
 1988: The daughter of the Pasha, the Minister
 1988: Days of Terror
 1989: An amazing story
 1989: The Taming of the Man
 1991: The Time of Al-Jadaan
 1992: Couples in Trouble
 1993: The Ship of Love and Torment
 1998: Ard Ard

Television 
 1976: Laqeeta
 1978: Ala Hamesh El-Seera
 1980: Bela Khatiaa
 1983: Zohour W Ashwak
 1987: Al-Zawga Awel Man Yaalam

References 

1934 births
2013 deaths
Egyptian actresses